Yashira Yuleth Barrientos González (born 29 November 1994) is a Mexican football forward who currently plays for Guadalajara in the Liga MX Femenil.

Career
Yashira Barrientos was born on 29 November 1994 in Nuevo Laredo, Tamaulipas.

She played football since school and she was offered a scholarship to play and study at the Autonomous University of Nuevo León. During this time, she was part of the squad that represented Mexico at the 2019 Summer Universiade football tournament in Naples.

On 12 July 2019, Barrientos was signed to Guadalajara and she finished the 2019–20 season as the team's top scorer with nine goals.

Career statistics

Club

References

External links
 

1994 births
Living people
Mexican women's footballers
Footballers from Tamaulipas
Liga MX Femenil players
C.D. Guadalajara (women) footballers
Sportspeople from Nuevo Laredo
Competitors at the 2019 Summer Universiade
Women's association football forwards
Mexican footballers